André "Andy" Egli (born 8 May 1958 in Bäretswil) is a Swiss football manager and former player who played as a defender.

Playing career
He was capped 79 times and scored nine goals for the Switzerland national team between 1979 and 1994. He was an unused substitute at the 1994 FIFA World Cup.

Honours
Grasshoppers
 Nationalliga A: 1981–82, 1982–83, 1989–90
 Swiss Cup: 1982–83, 1987–88, 1988–89, 1989–90
 Swiss Super Cup: 1989

Neuchâtel Xamax
 Swiss Super Cup: 1990

Servette
 Nationalliga A: 1993–94

References

External links
 
  

1958 births
Living people
People from Hinwil District
Swiss men's footballers
Association football defenders
Switzerland international footballers
1994 FIFA World Cup players
Swiss Super League players
Bundesliga players
Grasshopper Club Zürich players
Borussia Dortmund players
Neuchâtel Xamax FCS players
Servette FC players
Swiss football managers
FC Aarau managers
FC Luzern managers
SV Waldhof Mannheim managers
FC Biel-Bienne managers
FC Thun managers
Busan IPark managers
Swiss expatriate footballers
Swiss expatriate sportspeople in Germany
Expatriate footballers in Germany
Expatriate football managers in Germany
Swiss expatriate sportspeople in South Korea
Expatriate football managers in South Korea
Sportspeople from the canton of Zürich